Calliotropis boucheti is a species of sea snail, a marine gastropod mollusk in the family Eucyclidae.

Description
The length of the shell varies between 6 mm and 15 mm.

Distribution
This marine species occurs off the Philippines.

References

 Poppe G.T., Tagaro S.P. & Dekker H. (2006) The Seguenziidae, Chilodontidae, Trochidae, Calliostomatidae and Solariellidae of the Philippine Islands. Visaya Supplement 2: 1–228.
 Vilvens C. (2007) New records and new species of Calliotropis from Indo-Pacific. Novapex 8 (Hors Série 5): 1–72.

External links
 

boucheti
Gastropods described in 2006